Tembela is an administrative ward in the Mbeya Urban district of the Mbeya Region of Tanzania. In 2016 the Tanzania National Bureau of Statistics report there were 2,572 people in the ward, from 2,334 in 2012.

The TAZARA Railway run through the norther part of the ward.

Neighborhoods 
The ward has 2 neighborhoods; Reli, and Tembela.

References 

Wards of Mbeya Region